The , also translated as Musashino Platform and also named as Musashino Region, is a large tableland (known as a fluvial terrace) in the Kantō region of Honshu, Japan.

The Musashino Plateau is a plateau that extends between the Arakawa and Tama Rivers.

Origin
It consists of an alluvial fan formed by the ancient Tama River with a layer of volcanic ash on top, many meters deep.

The Tama River, which flowed downward as it carved the Okutama Mountains, formed a large alluvial fan with Ōme as the top of the fan. This alluvial fan is the base of the Musashino Plateau, and on it the Kantō Loam Formation is deposited with a thickness of approximately 5 to 15 meters. The Kantō Loam Formation is primarily andesite or basaltic sandy mud that was formed by volcanic ash from Mount Fuji that was carried by the west wind and deposited.

Terraces
Two types of developed river terraces can be seen on the Musashino Plateau. One is formed by the Tama River flowing on the south side, and the lowest terrace (low surface) is called Tachikawa terrace, and the terrace one step higher than that (high surface) is called Musashino terrace. The other is found in the north and is thought to be a remnant of the former Tama River channel.

Location
The plateau is located to the northwest of Tokyo Bay.

It is a plateau within the Kantō plain, in the southwest of that plain.

Much of Tokyo, between the Tama River to the south and the Arakawa River to the north, is built on the plateau. Its northern section is located in southern Saitama Prefecture.

References 

Landforms of Tokyo
Landforms of Saitama Prefecture
Plateaus of Japan